The Germany national under-19 speedway team is the national under-19 motorcycle speedway team of Germany and is controlled by the Deutscher Motor Sport Bund. The team was started in all editions of Team Speedway Junior European Championship and they won one silver medal. The German riders has never won a medal in Individual competition.

Competition

Riders 
Riders who started in Individual Speedway Junior European Championship Finals:

 Stefan Katt (1998 - 14th)
 Martin Smolinski (2000 - 4th, 2002 - 13th, 2003 - 16th)
 Matthias Schultz (2001 - 9th, 2003 - 9th)
 Hans Jorg Muller (2001 - 11th)
 Christian Hefenbrock (2004 - 8th)
 Alexander Lischke (2004 - 17th)
 Kevin Wölbert (2005 - 8th, 2006 - 10th, 2007 - 8th, 2008 - 6th)
 Tobias Busch (2007 - 11th)
 René Deddens (2009 - 17th)

See also 
 Germany national speedway team
 Germany national under-21 speedway team

External links 
 (de) Deutscher Motor Sport Bund webside

National speedway teams
Speedway
Team